Fulguropsis is a genus of sea snails, marine gastropod molluscs in the family Busyconidae, the crown conches and their allies.

Species
Species within the genus Fulguropsis include:
 Fulguropsis feldmanni Petuch, 1991
 Fulguropsis keysensis Petuch, 2013
 Fulguropsis plagosa (Conrad, 1863)
 Fulguropsis pyruloides (Say, 1822)
 † Fulguropsis radula Petuch, 1994
 Fulguropsis spirata (Lamarck, 1816)
 Fulguropsis texana (Hollister, 1958)
Species brought into synonymy
 Fulguropsis rachelcarsonae Petuch, R.F. Myers & Berschauer, 2015: synonym of Fulguropsis pyruloides rachelcarsonae Petuch, R. F. Myers & Berschauer, 2015 (original rank)
 Fulguropsis spiratum : synonym of Busycotypus spiratus (Lamarck, 1816), synonym of Fulguropsis spirata (Lamarck, 1816)

References

Further reading

External links

Busyconidae
Gastropod genera